uBreakiFix is an American chain of electronic repair shops, founded in 2009 with over 832 locations in 2016 across the United States, Canada and the Caribbean. They are most commonly known for repairing all kinds of household electronics. In August 2019, uBreakiFix was acquired by Asurion, LLC, an insurance company.

History 
uBreakiFix was established in Orlando, Florida as a single shop. It then quickly expanded by offering franchise opportunities. Their business model centers around servicing equipment such as smartphones, game consoles, tablets, and computers. In 2016, Google made them the only authorized walk-in repair provider for the Pixel and Pixel XL, providing the company with OEM (original equipment manufacturer) parts for replacements. Industry reports speculated that this choice was made in order for Google to compete with the Apple Genius Bar, which offers in-person iPhone repairs. Samsung formed a similar partnership with uBreakiFix in 2018, naming them as an authorized in-warranty Samsung repair center and providing stores with access to OEM components.
The uBreakiFix franchise was listed eighteenth on Entrepreneur’s 2018 Franchise 500 list.
 The company was also mentioned in the Orlando Business Journal as one of 2019’s “Fast 50,” a list of the top 50 fastest growing private companies in Orlando. Growth for this list is measured by marking percentage growth over a two year time frame, and companies must show consistent growth over a three-year period.

Rebranding 
Asurion has announced that uBreakiFix will be rebranding as Asurion Tech Repair & Solutions, hoping to rebrand all of their stores and mobile repair vans by the end of 2023.

References 

American companies established in 2009
Retail companies established in 2009
Franchises
Service retailing
2009 establishments in Florida